Nenjile Thunivirunthaal is a 1981 Tamil-language action drama film directed by S. A. Chandrasekhar, starring Vijayakanth and Swapna. It was released on 29 August 1981. The film was remade in Telugu as Palletoori Monagadu and in Kannada as Hasida Hebbuli.

Plot 

Muthu is falsely accused of murdering his father.

Cast 
Vijayakanth as Muthu
Swapna as Vasanthi
Goundamani
Manorama
Vijayashanti
Sangili Murugan

Soundtrack 
Soundtrack was composed by Shankar–Ganesh and lyrics by Vairamuthu, Pulamaipithan and Poonguyilan.

References

External links 
 

1980s Tamil-language films
1981 films
Films directed by S. A. Chandrasekhar
Films scored by Shankar–Ganesh
Tamil films remade in other languages